Avant-pop or avantpop may refer to:

 Avant-pop, a form of popular music
 Avant-pop (artistic movement), an American art movement derived from postmodernism
 Avant-Pop: Fiction for a Daydream Nation, a related book
 Avant Pop, 1986 album by Lester Bowie

See also
 Avant-garde (disambiguation)
 Experimental pop
 Art pop (disambiguation)